Joseph James Burns (June 17,  1916 – June 24, 1974) was an American Major League Baseball infielder.

References

External links

1916 births
1974 deaths
Boston Braves players
Major League Baseball infielders
Major League Baseball second basemen
Major League Baseball third basemen
Major League Baseball outfielders
Baseball players from Pennsylvania
South Boston Twins players
Richmond Colts players
South Boston Wrappers players
Longview Cannibals players
Oklahoma City Indians players
Indianapolis Indians players
Philadelphia Athletics players
People from Bryn Mawr, Pennsylvania